Praepodothrips is a genus of thrips in the family Phlaeothripidae.

Species
 Praepodothrips causiapeltus
 Praepodothrips cymbapogoni
 Praepodothrips flavicornis
 Praepodothrips indicus
 Praepodothrips nigrocephalus
 Praepodothrips priesneri
 Praepodothrips yunnanensis

References

Phlaeothripidae
Thrips
Thrips genera